Jermaine Russell Van Buren (born July 2, 1980) is a former pitcher in Major League Baseball. He played for the Chicago Cubs in 2005 and the Boston Red Sox in 2006.

Early career
Van Buren graduated from Hattiesburg High School, where he earned Mississippi Player of the Year honors in 1998 as a senior.

He was named to the 1998 ABCA/Rawlings High School All-America Third Team.

He was drafted in the 2nd round of the 1998 Major League Baseball draft by the Colorado Rockies.

Professional career

He would quickly go from being a low-ranked prospect to becoming part of the Cubs Triple-A team in Iowa.

In , he finished second in the Pacific Coast League with 25 saves and posted up a 1.98 ERA with 65 strikeouts in 54 innings pitched before receive a late call-up to the majors. He appeared in six games for the Cubs, ending with a 0-2 record, a 3.00 ERA, nine walks, and six strikeouts in 6.0 innings. At the end of the season, he was dealt by Chicago to the Boston Red Sox in exchange for minor league outfielder Matt Ciaramella.

In , Van Buren was called up when David Wells went on the disabled list and made his Red Sox debut against the Toronto Blue Jays on April 21. He was optioned to Triple-A Pawtucket a day later, and was recalled by Boston on May 24. Van Buren was optioned to Pawtucket June 19, but would return once again on July 28.

He was signed by the Washington Nationals to a minor league deal on November 7, 2006.

On December 3, 2006, he debuted with the Criollos de Caguas (Caguas Creoles) in the Puerto Rico Winter Professional baseball, as a closing pitcher.

On June 26, the Oakland Athletics acquired Van Buren from the Nationals for a player to be named later. In , he joined CPBL's La New Bears in Taiwan.

Personal
While playing for the Red Sox in 2006 he married the love of his life, Tiffany Suther.  
In the off-season, he teaches baseball at Amarillo Baseball Academy.

References

External links

1980 births
African-American baseball players
American expatriate baseball players in Taiwan
American people of Dutch descent
Asheville Tourists players
Tri-City Dust Devils players
Lansing Lugnuts players
West Tennessee Diamond Jaxx players
Iowa Cubs players
Pawtucket Red Sox players
Columbus Clippers players
Sacramento River Cats players
Boston Red Sox players
Chicago Cubs players
La New Bears players
Major League Baseball pitchers
Baseball players from Mississippi
Living people
Fort Worth Cats players
Amarillo Dillas players
21st-century African-American sportspeople
20th-century African-American people